Je M'Aime is a studio album by Sow released in 1994 and re-released in 1999. Je M'Aime is the first major release of Sow.

Releases
Hyperium Records #39100932 42 - CD, 1994
Invisible Records #INV 144 CD - CD, 1999 (re-release)

Track listing
"The Rock" - 5:53
"The World Is My Oyster" - 4:15
"Face Of Suede" - 6:52
"Blood Sucking Bitch" - 6:53
"Je M'Aime" - 3:28
"Gentille Petite Fille" - 5:07
"Manripe" - 9:07

Total playing time: 41:35

Versions of tracks 2 and 7 appeared also on the single Manripe. On that release track 2 is named "Found In The Lake" on the back and "4 Years Old" on the label on the record.

Personnel
Jon Caffery – Recording on 7, mixing on 7
Benedict Owen – Saxophone on 5
J. G. Thirlwell – writing on 4, instrumental performance on 4
Mike Watts – writing on 2, instrumental performance on 2
Raymond Watts – Production, writing, instrumental performance, recording on 1–6, mixing on 1–6
Anna Wildsmith – Lyrics, vocal performance

1999 re-release
Fernando Arias – Additional photography
Gerard Ivall – Inside booklet design
Steven Lovell-Davis – Cover design
Dominique Lutier – Additional photography
Martin Thompson – Cover and additional photography

Singles
Manripe (1989)

References

Sow (band) albums
1994 debut albums